"Here She Comes Again" is a song recorded by German recording artist Sasha. It was written by S. Esteban, B. Moore, Michael Amoroso, and Sasha for his third studio album Surfin' on a Backbeat (2001), while production was helmed by Boyd Barber and Grant Michael B. Released as the album's lead single, it reached the top thirty of the German Singles Chart.

Formats and track listings

Charts

Weekly charts

References

External links 
 

2001 singles
2001 songs
Sasha (German singer) songs